Chronic fatigue syndrome (CFS) is an illness with a long history of controversy. Many professionals within the medical community do not recognize CFS as a genuine condition, nor is there agreement on its prevalence. There has been much disagreement over the pathophysiology of chronic fatigue syndrome, how it should be diagnosed, and how to treat it.

The diagnosis is controversial, and its etiology is still not fully understood. Alternative names to describe the condition(s) have been used over time throughout the world. Patient groups have criticized the name "chronic fatigue syndrome", saying that it trivializes the illness.

Naming

A 2007 article in The New York Times reported that patients prefer the terms myalgic encephalomyelitis or myalgic encephalopathy to "chronic fatigue syndrome". These patients believed the term fatigue trivializes the illness and discourages research into potential treatments.

According to a survey of medical trainees at a school in the United States, a condition described as "chronic fatigue syndrome" may be considered less serious than a condition described as "myalgic encephalopathy". In 2004, a paper reported that the majority of the CFS patients questioned in a survey wanted the name changed from chronic fatigue syndrome.

Cause, diagnosis and treatment

Recognition
Historically, many professionals within the medical community were unfamiliar with CFS, or they did not recognize it as a real condition, and disagreed on its prevalence or seriousness. A 2005 study in the UK surveyed 811 general practitioners' attitudes and knowledge of CFS. 72% accepted CFS as a recognizable clinical entity, but 48% did not feel confident diagnosing it, and 41% did not feel confident in treatment. The CFS Advisory Committee (Part of the US Department of Health) in 2007 found that a survey of 1,500 US primary care providers showed that 90% believed CFS can impair quality of life, 20% strongly or somewhat agreed that CFS is only in the patient's head, and 70% said not enough information is available to diagnose CFS. A 2008 Norwegian study that explored barriers to quality care faced by patients with chronic fatigue syndrome concluded, "Current medical scepticism and ignorance regarding CFS shapes the context of medical care and the illness experiences of CFS patients, who may feel they neither get a proper assessment nor management."

Training may influence attitudes to CFS. One study conducted a relatively brief seminar presenting factual information on CFS to a cohort of fourth year medical students. The authors concluded the information provided was associated with a more favorable attitude toward CFS. In the UK, the 2002 Chief Medical Officer's report stated that all doctors should consider CFS as a serious chronic illness and treat patients accordingly. In 2006, the US Centers for Disease Control and Prevention (CDC) launched a national program to educate the American public and health care professionals about CFS.

Contrasting viewpoints
There has been much disagreement over proposed cause(s), diagnosis, and treatment of the illness. Contrasting viewpoints have been expressed by different CFS researchers. One influential 1993 Lancet paper argued that CFS was a form of neurasthenia to be classified as a psychiatric condition, and a subsequent 1998 paper concluded that behavioral, cognitive, and affective factors all played a role in perpetuating fatigue. More recently, a 2005 population-based study, which used a similar methodology to the earlier 1998 study, found important differences between CFS and psychiatrically explained chronic fatigue which could affect the development of therapy and explanatory models. They concluded that the 1998 model adequately represented chronic fatigue secondary to psychiatric conditions, but not CFS.

Contested causation may have serious negative effects on healthcare for individuals, as it may erode patient-provider trust, test the provider's self-assurance and capacity to share power with the patient, and raise problematic issues of reparation, compensation and blame.

In 2011, a major divide still existed as to whether funding should be directed towards biomedical or psychological research.

XMRV retrovirus

In 2009, the journal Science published a study that identified the XMRV retrovirus in blood samples of a population of people with CFS. After the Science publication, media attention generated interest in the XMRV virus worldwide. Doubts over the legitimacy of CFS had long caused patient frustration about the marginalization of the debilitating illness, and persons with CFS and their support organizations were optimistic the cause of their symptoms had been found.

Many countries reacted quickly to protect the blood supply from the XMRV retrovirus by banning persons with CFS from donating blood. The United States funded a 1.3 million dollar study to try to validate the findings, and some people with the illness started taking antiviral drugs in hopes of symptomatic improvement.

Many studies failed to reproduce this finding, and recriminations of misconduct from the various stakeholders grew angry and bitter.

In 2011, the editor of Science formally retracted its XMRV paper while the Proceedings of the National Academy of Sciences similarly retracted a 2010 paper which had appeared to support the finding of a connection between XMRV and CFS. Studies eventually concluded that neither people nor the blood supply had been infected with the XMRV virus, and the origin of the virus was likely a lab contaminant in the supplies used by the polymerase chain reaction (PCR) process of the studies that found virus in blood.

PACE trial

PACE was a large trial investigating the efficacy and safety of three treatments adjunctive to specialist medical care (SMC): cognitive behavioural therapy (CBT), graded exercise therapy (GET), and adaptive pacing therapy (APT). The results were published in February 2011 and concluded that CBT and GET were each "moderately" effective compared to SMC alone, while APT was not found to be effective when added to SMC.

The trial generated considerable adverse criticism. Letters to the editor critiqued the definitions of secondary outcomes, questioned post-hoc protocol changes, and expressed concern over generalisability of the results. Patient groups and the IACFS/ME (an organization of researchers and health care professionals interested in CFS) criticized the trial for over-simplified and exaggerated conclusions, for using a flawed psychosocial illness model that ignores biological evidence, for testing a non-representative version of pacing, and because the results seriously conflict with their member surveys which show that pacing is effective and CBT or GET can cause deterioration in many patients who use the treatments. One notable researcher submitted a 442-page letter to the Medical Research Council outlining his criticisms of the trial, and a shorter 43-page complaint to the Lancet. The MRC and the Lancet rejected the submissions. A Lancet editorial responded to the adverse criticism by suggesting that some critics could be part of "an active campaign to discredit the research." In 2011, Lancet Editor Richard Horton defended the trial, calling the critics "a fairly small, but highly organized, very vocal and very damaging group of individuals who have, I would say, actually hijacked this agenda and distorted the debate so that it actually harms the overwhelming majority of patients."

More recent criticisms of the trial have come from the scientific community. For example, biostatistician Bruce Levin of Columbia University described the study as "the height of clinical trial amateurism", and Ronald Davis of Stanford University wrote, "I'm shocked that the Lancet published it...The PACE study has so many flaws and there are so many questions you'd want to ask about it that I don't understand how it got through any kind of peer review". In an analysis of the study's design, the mathematician Professor Rebecca Goldin wrote that "There were problems with the study on almost all levels... the flaws in this design were enough to doom its results from the start." Professor Jonathan Edwards of University College London (UCL) has written that the PACE trial "is an unblinded trial with subjective outcome measures. That makes it a non-starter in the eyes of any physician or clinical pharmacologist familiar with problems of systematic bias in trial execution."

The full research data for the PACE trial was requested by both patients acting as citizen scientists, and by other researchers but was initially denied until a 2016 tribunal ordered the data be released. Several researchers published a re-analysis of the PACE trial data, but drawing the conclusion that the CBT and GET treatments were not effective and possibly not safe. The full PACE trial outcome data showed that the treatments did not result in patients being able to return to work or study, and that they were not able to walk significantly further after treatment. This new information was one of several factors that lead to the UK deciding to complete a full review and update to its diagnostic and treatment guidelines for CFS/ME.

Support for patients in the UK and USA

A 2006 investigation by a group from the Parliament of the United Kingdom found there was not enough support in the UK for CFS patients in terms of access to government benefits and health care. Individuals with the condition describe the struggle for healthcare and legitimacy due to what they consider to be bureaucratic denial of the condition because of its lack of a known etiology. Institutions maintain the exclusion of patient support by rhetorical arguments of the open-endedness of science to delay new findings of fact. This has resulted in an expensive and prolonged conflict for all involved.

Research funding diversion at the CDC
In 1998, William Reaves, a director at the Centers for Disease Control (CDC), alleged deceptive Congressional testimony was given by officials at the agency concerning CFS research activities conducted by the organization; specifically, funds for programs intended for CFS research were diverted to other projects and not reported. He also stated he was retaliated against by his superior, Brian Mahy, after he reported the irregularities.

A Government Accounting Office (GAO) investigation disclosed almost 13 million dollars for CFS research had been redirected or improperly accounted for by the CDC. The agency stated the funds were redistributed in order to respond to other public health emergencies. The director of a U.S. national patient advocacy group charged the CDC had a bias against studying the disease.

In response, the CDC pledged reforms to accounting practices to reduce misuse of funds earmarked for specific diseases. Additionally, the money diverted from CFS research was to be restored over a period of three years.

Potential harms to patients
A review in 2019 identified seven possible types of medical harm that patients with CFS may face, and concluded that biopsychosocial model had a focus that was "too narrow" and did not fit the "patient narrative". A UK treatment programme of psycho-behavioral interventions was found to fail to meet the needs of patients with chronic fatigue syndrome, and to lack oversight. A number of different authors have raised concerns about medical harm to patients, particularly resulting from the use of cognitive behavioral therapy (CBT) as a primary treatment, the use of graded exercise therapy (GET), and delays in diagnosis.

Concerns have also been raised about a clinical trial of the Lightning Process in children, a treatment not approved for use in adults, and a series of publications have been corrected due to inaccurate ethics statements.

Historical perceptions

Epidemic cases of myalgic encephalomyelitis were called mass hysteria by psychiatrists McEvedy and Beard in 1970, provoking criticism in letters to the editor of the British Medical Journal by attending physicians, researchers, and nurses who fell ill. The psychiatrists were criticized for not investigating the patients they described, and their conclusions have been refuted. In 1978 a symposium held at the Royal Society of Medicine (RSM) concluded that epidemic myalgic encephalomyelitis was a distinct disease entity.

However, the idea that CFS may be culturally mediated persisted in some quarters. In her 1997 book Hystories: Hysterical Epidemics and Modern Culture, literary critic and feminist Elaine Showalter argues that chronic fatigue syndrome is a "hysterical narrative", a modern manifestation of hysteria, a self-perpetuating "cultural symptom of anxiety and stress" historically assigned to women.

Political
A 2006 report by the UK Parliamentary Group on Scientific Research into Myalgic Encephalomyelitis stated that: "CFS/ME is defined as a psychosocial illness by the Department for Work and Pensions (DWP) and medical insurance companies. Therefore, claimants are not entitled to the higher level of benefit payments. We recognise that if CFS/ME remains as one illness and/or both remain defined as psychosocial then it would be in the financial interest of both the DWP and the medical insurance companies." The Group called for investigation of what they called, "numerous cases where advisors to the DWP have also had consultancy roles in medical insurance companies. Particularly the Company UNUMProvident. Given the vested interest private medical insurance companies have in ensuring CFS/ME remain classified as a psychosocial illness there is blatant conflict of interest here." The Secretary of State for Work and Pensions responded that "Entitlement to Disability Living Allowance depends on the effects that severe physical or mental disability has on a person's need for personal care and/or their ability to walk, and not on particular disabilities or diagnoses. The benefit is available to people with myalgic encephalomyelitis (which can have a physical basis or a psychological basis, or can be due to a combination of factors) on exactly the same terms as other severely disabled people, and they can qualify for it provided that they meet the usual entitlement conditions."

Reports of researcher harassment in the UK

Researchers who advocate classifying CFS as a psychosocial illness have been criticized by those who believe that their work draws attention and funding away from research into biomedical treatments. In 2012, several prominent UK researchers adopting the psychosocial perspective reported to the press that they had been verbally abused by patients, and one reported receiving death threats. In 2019, PACE trial author Prof. Michael Sharpe said that he was subject to near daily intimidation and abuse from people upset with his work, because they believe it means the illness is psychological. He said that he believes that CFS is a "biological condition that can be perpetuated by social and psychological factors". Blease and Geragty (2018) investigated the assertions, and submitted that the claims of researcher harassment were used to argue against releasing the full anonymised data from the PACE trial at the 2016 Freedom of Information tribunal. The tribunal judge stated the claims of harassment had been "wildly exaggerated by the trial authors and their expert witnesses", and ordered the release of the data.

Blease and Geragty found "no compelling evidence" the vast majority of ME/CFS patients or their advocacy organizations had adopted "militant political policies or behaviours", and reported ME/CFS activists used public discourse and scientific publications analogous to 1980s "AIDS" activists. They concluded the medical establishment's negative perceptions of persons with ME/CFS, and indifference to patient's opinions conceptualized the ME/CFS community's discontent.

References

Further reading

 

Chronic fatigue syndrome
Medical controversies